Voodoo Soup is a posthumous compilation album by American rock musician Jimi Hendrix, released in the United States on April 11, 1995, by MCA Records. It was one of the last Hendrix albums produced by Alan Douglas, who was also responsible for the posthumous Hendrix releases Midnight Lightning and Crash Landing in 1975.

Background
Voodoo Soup was Douglas' attempt at presenting Hendrix's planned fourth studio album. The first attempt in 1971, The Cry of Love, produced by drummer Mitch Mitchell and Eddie Kramer (with a credit to Hendrix), was then out of print (last released on CD in 1992; re-released in 2014). After Experience Hendrix, a family company, gained control of his recordings, First Rays of the New Rising Sun was released in 1997 as another attempt to realize the album Hendrix had planned. Since then, Voodoo Soup has remained out of print.

Critical reception 

Reviewing for Entertainment Weekly in 1995, music critic David Browne said that, unlike other assorted compilations of Hendrix's music, Voodoo Soup coheres and sounds "as fluid and cohesive as a preconceived record, without a bad song in the bunch". Vibe magazine called it a valuable release in Hendrix's discography, in spite of Douglas's questionable decision to overdub newly recorded drums to some songs, while a reviewer from Melody Maker said the overly detailed liner notes cannot change the fact "it's opened my ears to the near God-like genius of Jimi Hendrix". Greg Kot of the Chicago Tribune said in his review that the compilation's mostly exceptional songs suggest Hendrix was considering a variety of paths in his music before dying in 1970. Stereo Review magazine's Parke Puterbaugh applauded the recording quality and concluded, "What's most impressive about Voodoo Soup is how contemporary – or, rather, timeless – Hendrix 's music sounds a quarter-century later. His creative intensity and musical vitality tower above anything else ever attempted, before or since, in popular music."

Voodoo Soup was later praised by Hendrix biographer Charles Shaar Murray, who claimed it "more than earns its place in the pantheon of great Hendrix albums" as it "brought the Hendrix studio quartet -finally!- to a satisfactory conclusion". AllMusic editor Stephen Thomas Erlewine was more critical in a retrospective review: "For most fans, the re-recorded drum tracks by the drummer of the Knack was the most unforgivable sin, yet the album is also poorly sequenced and lacks several important tracks."

Track listing

Personnel
Jimi Hendrixguitars, vocals
Billy Coxbass guitar
Mitch Mitchelldrums
Juma Sultanpercussion
Buddy Milesdrums on "Ezy Ryder", "Message to Love"
Noel Reddingbass guitar on "Peace in Mississippi" and "Midnight"
Bruce Garyre-recorded drum track on "Room Full of Mirrors" and "Stepping Stone"

Footnotes

References

Further reading

External links 
 

1995 compilation albums
Albums recorded at Electric Lady Studios
Albums produced by Alan Douglas (record producer)
Compilation albums published posthumously
Jimi Hendrix compilation albums
MCA Records compilation albums